James Crawford was a Scottish professional footballer, who played as a centre forward for Burnley in the early 1900s. He served in the Royal Navy during the First World War, he was aboard the HMS Majestic when it sunk, killing him.

References

Year of birth unknown
Footballers from Stirling
Scottish footballers
Association football forwards
Burnley F.C. players
English Football League players
Year of death missing